The Charitable Uses Act of 1601 (known as the Statute of Elizabeth) is an Act (43 Eliz I, c.4) of the Parliament of England. It was repealed by section 13(1) of the Mortmain and Charitable Uses Act 1888 (c.42) (but see section 13(2) of that Act).

The preamble to the act contained a list of purposes or activities that was, in effect, a list of purposes or activities that the State believed were of general benefit to society, and to which the State wanted to encourage private contributions. The list has formed the foundation of the modern definition of charitable purposes, which has developed through case law. This has come about because the courts, in considering whether or not a particular purpose was charitable in law, have tended to look for an analogy between the purpose under consideration and the list, and to recognise the purpose as charitable if an analogy with the 1601 list could be found.   

The list contained in the 1601 Preamble is:
 "The relief of aged, impotent, and poor people."
 "The maintenance of sick and maimed soldiers and mariners."
 "The maintenance of schools of learning, free schools, and scholars in universities."
 "The repair of bridges, ports, havens, causeways, churches, sea-banks, and highways."
 "The education and preferment of orphans."
 "The relief, stock, or maintenance for houses of correction."
 "Marriages of poor maids."
 "The supportation, aid, and help of young tradesmen, handicraftsmen, and persons decayed."
 "The relief or redemption of prisoners or captives."
 "The aid or ease of any poor inhabitants concerning payment of fifteens, setting out of soldiers, and other taxes."

Notes

References

External links

1601 in law
1601 in England
Acts of the Parliament of England (1485–1603)
Charity in the United Kingdom
English trusts law
Charity law